This is a list of stuffed dishes, comprising dishes and foods that are prepared with various fillings and stuffings. Some dishes are not actually stuffed; the added ingredients are simply spread atop the base food, as one cannot truly stuff an oyster or a mussel or a pizza.

Stuffed dishes

 A-gei
 Chả giò
 Chatti pathiri
 Chaudin – a meat dish from southern Louisiana, it is a sausage-like variant made from ingredients such as spices, pork, rice and vegetables that are sewn up in a pig's stomach, which is then cooked. The dish is sometimes smoked.
 Chicken Kiev
 Chiles en nogada
 Cordon bleu
 Deviled egg
 Dolma – a family of stuffed vegetable dishes common in the Middle East and surrounding regions including the Balkans, the Caucasus, Russia and Central Asia. Common vegetables to stuff include tomato, pepper, onion, zucchini, eggplant, and garlic. The stuffing may or may not include meat.
 Dorma – a variant of dolma popular in West Bengal and Bangladesh, in which potol is stuffed with fish.
 Drob
 Kab yob
 Eggah
 Empanada
 Figolla
 Galantine
 Ghapama
 Gołąbki 
 Gordita
 Guanime
 Gyeran-mari
 Haggis
 Hallaca
 Helzel
 Hotteok
 İmam bayıldı 
 Jalangkote
 Jalapeño popper 
 Jamaican patty
 Kachori
 Kalitsounia
 Karađorđeva šnicla
 Karnıyarık 
 Khai yat sai
 Kibbeh
 Kibinai
 Knish
 Kousa mahshi
 Krautshäuptchen
 Ladera – sometimes stuffed
 Lechona
 Lemper
 Llapingacho
 Manok pansoh
 À la Maréchale
 Mirchi Bada 
 Mücver
 Murtabak
 Nacatamal
 Onigiri
 Papa rellena
 Paste
 Pastel
 Pasteles
 Pasztecik szczeciński
 Pirozhki
 Plátanos rellenos – a typical dish of the Veracruz coast, it consists of plantain stuffed with meat and seasonings and fried.
 Pocket sandwich
 Porchetta
 Pupusa de arroz
 Qistibi
 Quesito
 Rellenong talong
 Rissole
 Rouladen
 Sajji
 Sakhu sai mu
 Samgye-tang

Asian-style "buns"

 Bánh bao
 Baozi
 List of baozi
 Bakpia pathok
 Beef bun
 Buttered pineapple bun
 Cha siu bao
 Cocktail bun
 Jjinppang – a steamed bun, typically filled with red bean paste with bits of broken beans and bean husk.
 Hoppang
 Nikuman
 Peanut butter bun
 Xab Momo
 Xiaolongbao

Desserts and sweets

 Banana boat
 Cornulețe
 Cream bun
 Cuccidati
 Éclair
 Jelly doughnut
 Khanom sot sai
 Klepon
 Milk-cream strudel
 Pampushka
 Pisang hijau
 Poornalu
 Pootharekulu
 Puits d'amour
 Stuffed racuchy
 Rellenitos de plátano
 Scovardă
 Şöbiyet
 Swiss roll
 Tortell
 Turon
 Unnakai

Dumplings

Pierogi

Fish and seafood dishes

 Crappit heid – a traditional Scots fish course, consisting of a boiled fish head stuffed with oats, suet and liver.
 Stuffed clam
Lavangi (food) –  an Azerbaijani dish consisting of fish or chicken stuffed with walnuts, onions and various condiments and baked in the oven.
 Lobster Thermidor
 Stuffed mussels 
 Stuffed squid

Flatbreads
 Bolani
 Stuffed paratha – paratha is an unleavened flatbread that is sometimes stuffed with various ingredients.
 Aloo paratha –  unleavened dough stuffed with a spiced mixture of mashed potato.
 Gobhi paratha – stuffed with flavored cauliflower and vegetables.

Fried doughs and fritters

 Aloo pie
 Arancini
 Barbajuan
 Bichak
 Carimañola
 Chebureki
 Chile relleno 
 Curry puffs
 Taquito
 Samosa
 Sgabeo
 Sorullos – sometimes stuffed with cheese.

Breads and pastries

Several pastries have various types of fillings.

 Bagel dog
 Berliner
 Bierock
 Birnbrot
 Bossche bol
 Cannoli
 Chorley cake
 Cuban pastry
 Curry puff
 Flaons
 Gibanica
 Gujiya
 Gözleme
 Gyeongju bread
 Hot Pockets
 Jambon
 Heong Peng
 Klobasnek
 Knish
 Kolach
 Kołacz
 Makroudh
 Marillenknödel
 Miguelitos
 Milhoja
 Milk-cream strudel
 Moorkop
 Öçpoçmaq
 Panzarotti
 Pastel 
 Pastizz
 Pigs in blankets
 Profiterole
 Punschkrapfen
 Quesito
 Runza
 Rustico
 Sausage bread
 Schaumrolle
 Semla
 Sfogliatelle
 Šoldra
 Stromboli
 Toaster pastry
 Torpil
 Tortell
 Turnover

Wraps

 Cabbage roll 
 Holishkes 
 Cheese roll
 Chicken fillet roll
 Devils on horseback
 Egg roll
 Galette-saucisse
 Kati roll
 Ngo hiang (also known as heh gerng or lor bak) 
 Pepperoni roll
 Prawn roll – a sandwich, not a stuffed food item.
 Rice noodle roll
 Small sausage in large sausage
 Spring roll – a large variety of filled, rolled appetizers or dim sum found in East Asian and Southeast Asian cuisine.
 Gỏi cuốn
 Popiah
 Lumpia
  Sarma (also called "stuffed grape leaves" or "stuffed vine leaves")
 Thịt bò nướng lá lốt

Game, poultry, offal

 Ballotine
 Boliche
 Cachopo
 Carpetbag steak
 Stuffed chine
 Stuffed ham
 Jucy Lucy
 Sapu Mhicha
 Stuffed intestines
 Tripoux
 Turducken 
 Turkey
 Whole stuffed camel
 Zrazy

Pancakes and crepes
 Apam balik
 Bánh xèo
 Blini

Starch paste cakes

 Arem-arem
 Bánh chưng
 Bánh lá
 Bánh tét
 Tamale
 Zongzi

Sandwiches

Sausages

Stuffed pasta

Some pasta varieties and dishes are stuffed with various fillings.
 Cannelloni
 Casoncelli
 Casunziei
 Manicotti
 Maultasche
 Mezzelune
 Occhi di Lupo
 Paccheri – sometimes stuffed
 Ravioli
 Tortellini
 Tortelloni

Stuffed pizzas

 Calzone
 Pizza snack rolls
 Scaccia
 Stuffed pizza
 Stuffed crust pizza

Pies

Stuffed vegetables

 Badrijani
 Eggplant papucaki 
 Makdous
 Punjena paprika
 Seon – traditional Korean dishes which are prepared by steaming vegetables such as zucchini, cucumbers, eggplants, or Napa cabbages that are stuffed with various ingredients.
 Sheikh al-mahshi – zucchini stuffed with minced lamb meat and pine nuts in yogurt sauce.
 Stuffed artichoke
 Stuffed cabbage
 Stuffed cucumber
 Sogan-dolma – means "stuffed onions" in Turkish.
 Stuffed eggplant 
 Stuffed squash
 Stuffed tomatoes
 Stuffed mushrooms
 Stuffed peppers 
 Stuffed sorrel

Stuffed fruits

 Stuffed dates 
 Stuffed quinces 
 Stuffed melon 
 Stuffed apples 
 Tufahije
 Walnut stuffed figs

Turkish stuffed dishes

 Paçanga böreği
 Squash blossom 
 Stuffed mallow 
 Stuffed ribs

See also

 Cordon bleu (dish) – a dish of meat wrapped around cheese (or with cheese filling), then breaded and pan-fried or deep-fried
 Fritter – a name applied to a wide variety of fried foods, usually consisting of a portion of batter or breading which has been filled with various ingredients
 List of rolled foods
 Pie – a baked dish which is usually made of a pastry dough casing that covers or completely contains a filling of various sweet or savory ingredients
 Meat pie
 List of pies, tarts and flans
 Pies (Category)
 Savoury pies (Category)
 Roulade – a dish of filled rolled meat or pastry
 Tempura – a Japanese dish of seafood or vegetables that have been battered and deep fried

References

External links
 

 
Stuffed vegetable dishes
Stuffed